Sarcodon cyanellus is a species of tooth fungus in the family Bankeraceae. Found in the Pacific Northwest region of North America, where it associates with Pinaceae, it was described as new to science in 1964 by mycologist Kenneth A. Harrison, who initially called it Hydnum cyanellum. He transferred it to the genus Sarcodon in 1984. It has a vinaceous-violet to bluish-black cap.

References

External links
Herbarium of the University of Michigan Photo of holotype collection

Fungi described in 1984
Fungi of North America
cyanellus